The United States sent a delegation to compete at the 1972 Summer Paralympics in Heidelberg, West Germany.  Its athletes finished second to the host nation West Germany in the gold medal count and first in the overall medal count.

See also 
 1972 Summer Paralympics
 United States at the 1972 Summer Olympics

References

External links
International Paralympic Committee Official Website
United States Paralympic Committee Official Website

Nations at the 1972 Summer Paralympics
1972
Summer Paralympics